Die Wilgers is a residential suburb of the city of Pretoria, South Africa. Located to the east of Lynnwood Ridge in a leafy, established area that is home to some affordable real estate.

Education
 Hoërskool Die Wilgers, Afrikaans medium high school situated in Die Wilgers.
 Willowridge High School, English medium high school situated in Die Wilgers.
 Deutsche Schule Pretoria, German international school (kindergarten through K12) in Die Wilgers.
 Cranefield College, a reputable higher education institution is headquartered in The Willows

References

Suburbs of Pretoria